A tchitcherik or tchitcherik sakwa (plural: tchitcheri sakab) is a statue of the ancestors of the Moba of northern Togo and Ghana.

Uses 
Tchitcheri sakab are wooden sculptures of varying sizes (around a metre in general) that represent figures of ancestors, the word sakab meaning "ancestors" in Moba language. They are planted in the soil, sometimes up to the groin, which explains why the legs are often eaten by xylophagus insects. The tchitcheri are named after the clan of the ancestors they are supposed to honor.

Only the diviners can order such a sculpture, they also determine its size and sex. The tchitcheri are minimalist sculptures reminiscent of abstract art, a cylindrical trunk with straight arms and legs, surmounted by a round head and without neck.

References

Bibliography 
 Douglas Newton, African and Oceanic Art in Jerusalem: The Israel Museum, Muzeʼon Yiśraʼel (Jerusalem), 2001 
 Annie Dupuis , Jacques Ivanoff, Ethnocentrisme et création, 2014
 Dieter Gleisberg, Merkur & die Musen: Schätze der Weltkultur aus Leipzig, 1989
 Mein Afrika: die Sammlung Fritz Koenig, 2000

African art
Magic (supernatural)
Religious objects